Robert Sidney Buck (27 November 1884 – 15 May 1960) was a footballer who played international football for both Argentina and Uruguay.

Club career
Buck played for Montevideo Wanderers F.C. and Quilmes Atlético Club.

International career
Buck made his debut for Uruguay against Argentina in a Copa Newton match in Montevideo. He later represented Uruguay at the unofficial 1910 Copa América where he scored one goal for the tournament.

In 1912 Buck played one match for Argentina against Uruguay in Montevideo.

References

1884 births
1960 deaths
Uruguayan footballers
Association football wingers
Argentine footballers
Uruguay international footballers
Argentina international footballers
Dual internationalists (football)
Montevideo Wanderers F.C. players
Quilmes Atlético Club footballers
Argentine people of Scottish descent